France 3 Alsace is a regional television service and part of the France 3 network. Serving the Alsace region from its headquarters in Strasbourg, France 3 Alsace produces regional news, sport, features and entertainment programming.

History 
RTF Télé-Strasbourg began broadcasting on 15 October 1953. In 1964, RTF was replaced with ORTF by the government, with RTF Télé-Strasbourg becoming ORTF Télé-Strasbourg. After the de-establishment of ORTF on 6 January 1975, ORTF Télé-Strasbourg became FR3 Alsace. Following the establishment of France Télévisions on 7 September 1992, FR3 Alsace was rebranded France 3 Alsace.

Programming

News
France 3 Alsace produces two daily region-wide news programmes - a 15 to 20-minute bulletin (midi-pile) at 1200 CET during 12|13 and the main half-hour news at 1900 during 19|20. Two 10-minute sub-regional bulletins, Strasbourg-Deux Rives (serving Bas-Rhin) and France 3 Haute-Alsace (serving Haut-Rhin) are broadcast during 19|20 at 1845 CET.

Rund um, a short bulletin in the Alsatian language with French subtitles, is also aired each weekday after the regional 12|13 bulletin.

On 5 January 2009, a 5-minute late night bulletin was introduced, forming part of Soir 3.

Non-news programming 
 Triangle
 C'est mieux le matin
 Vis à vis
 7 jours en Alsace et Le Mag (Current affairs debate)
 Européos (programme on Europe and European institutions)
 Sportshow (a weekly sport programme)
 La voix est libre (debate show)
 Gsuntheim (Alsatian-language weekend magazine)
 Sür un Siess (cooking programme, also in Alsatian)

Capital 
France 3 Alsace has an annual budget of €20.4 million (£14.3 m, $29.3 m) (roughly 2% of the national budget of France 3).

Broadcast area 
As well as the target coverage area of Alsace, France 3 Alsace also broadcasts to Basel in Switzerland and parts of Baden-Württemberg and Rhineland-Palatinate in Germany, counting to an overall potential audience of around 2.5 million people (including 1.8 million in Alsace).

References

External links 
 Official site 

03 Alsace
Television channels and stations established in 1953
Mass media in Strasbourg
Television in minority languages